Mark Anthony Tildesley (31 August 1976 – 1 June 1984) was a seven-year-old English child who disappeared on 1 June 1984 whilst visiting a funfair in Wokingham, Berkshire. A widespread search of the Wokingham area, involving both police officers and British Army soldiers, did not locate him. Thames Valley Police initially suspected that his body was buried near Wellington Road in Wokingham, near the funfair from which he was abducted, but they now believe that he was probably buried in a shallow grave on abandoned farmland.

To publicise Tildesley's disappearance, a national poster campaign was launched, with one displayed in every police station in the country. The disappearance was publicised in the local Wokingham Times, in national newspapers like The Times, the Daily Mail and the Daily Mirror, and on television programmes including ITV's Thames News and the premiere episode of the BBC's Crimewatch UK. Despite a massive public response, however, Tildesley was still not located.

In 1989, Tildesley's disappearance was linked to the Operation Orchid investigation into missing children. In 1990 as part of this investigation, it emerged that on the night he disappeared, Tildesley had been abducted, drugged, tortured, raped and murdered by a London-based paedophile gang led by Sidney Cooke. A member of the gang, Leslie Bailey, was charged with murder in 1991 and was given two life sentences after pleading guilty to manslaughter the following year; he was murdered in prison in 1993.

A memorial service for Tildesley was held and a memorial bench placed at the entrance to the fairground site. A headstone was also placed in a nearby burial ground.

Background and disappearance

Mark Tildesley

Mark Anthony Tildesley was born on 31 August 1976 in Berkshire to John Tildesley and Lavinia Rachel Gwladys Tildesley. He had a brother, Christopher (b. 1963), and a sister, Christina (b. 1959), who had moved out of the family home to live in nearby Finchampstead with her husband, Ted, and their daughter, Mary (b. 1981). Tildesley was a Year 3 pupil of the Palmer C of E Junior School in Norreys Avenue in Wokingham.

The Tildesleys lived at 1 Rose Court, off Rose Street, in Wokingham town centre. It was a combination of a small semi-detached cottage and an adjoining bungalow annexe (the annexe has since been demolished and re-built as a separate house called 1a Rose Court , leaving the original cottage as a mid-terrace).

Half-term holiday
On 25 May 1984, Tildesley's school had broken up for its spring half-term holiday. The Frank Ayers Fun Fair, which came to the Carnival Field off Wellington Road in Wokingham four times a year, had come again during that holiday week.

Tildesley was desperate to go to the funfair but did not have enough money to do so. His pocket money was only 30p a week, so he supplemented this by putting trolleys from a Tesco location in Denmark Street back to where they belonged, thus collecting their customers' abandoned 10p deposits.

Frank Ayers Fun Fair
At the end of the week, on the afternoon of 1 June 1984, Tildesley had met a man outside the Candy Shop in Denmark Street, located twenty yards up from the Tesco location, who gave him a 50p coin with which to buy some sweets. The shop assistant who had served Tildesley many times before, Margaret Hickman, thought it was odd as he usually only paid in 10p pieces. The man said that he was going to the funfair later that day and that he would pay for him to go on the dodgems that evening.

After eating dinner, at just after 5:30 pm, Tildesley left 1 Rose Court on his most treasured possession, a second-hand gold Raleigh Tomahawk bicycle, to make the half-a-mile journey to the funfair, which would open at 6pm that evening. He promised to be back home by 7:30 pm, saying, "Don't worry mum, I won't be late". On his way to the fair, he met with two of his friends who were in the town at the time. However, they wanted to go back home first and then go to the funfair later, so Tildesley decided to go to the fair alone immediately. This was the last time anyone who knew Tildesley well saw him alive.

Reported missing
At 7:30 pm, the time at which Tildesley had promised to return home, he had still not arrived. At 8:00 pm, his parents went down to the fair to find him. However, all they could find was his bicycle chained to railings near to the entrance of the fairground. Having spent an hour searching around the site to no avail, Tildesley's parents returned home with his bicycle to find his brother Christopher watching television but no trace of their missing son.

At 10:00 pm, Tildesley's mother phoned the local police to report him missing and to ask if they had heard anything; they recommended she phone back in an hour. In the meantime, she phoned his sister Christina in Finchampstead, and Christina's husband Ted also went over to the fairground to search for Tildesley without any success.

Searches and public appeals

Initial search
Thames Valley Police undertook an intensive and thorough search of the Wokingham area. This included deploying a helicopter and searching the fairground with loud hailer appeals, as well as searching nearby rivers, streams, lakes and ponds. Heat seeking equipment was also borrowed from the Metropolitan Police which could detect dead bodies. Every worker and stall holder at the funfair was questioned the day after Tildesley went missing. Wokingham town centre's 29 streets, consisting of 960 shops, businesses and houses, had to be covered by officers on a door-to-door basis.

On the following weekend of 9–10 June 1984, fifteen policemen and two tracker dogs teamed up with 100 soldiers from the Royal Electrical and Mechanical Engineers training battalion in Arborfield Garrison to search the south side of Wokingham, from Barkham Road through to Amen Corner, which proved unproductive. Two weeks after the disappearance, Detective Superintendent Roger Nicklin had to concede that the police still had "absolutely no idea about Mark's disappearance".

A train driver on the Guildford to Reading line reported seeing a fox carrying what looked like a child's arm in its mouth, but this was determined out to have been animal bones. A strong smell of decomposed flesh was also reported in the nearby village of Crowthorne, but this turned out to be rotten sheep.

National appeals
In addition to a national poster campaign being launched, with every police station in the country displaying one, Tildesley's disappearance received regional and national news coverage. The Wokingham Times, The Times of London, the Daily Mail and the Daily Mirror all wrote about the story, and the case was also covered in ITV's Thames News. On 7 June, Tildesley's disappearance was mentioned on the premiere episode of the BBC television series Crimewatch UK. These first appeals resulted in 400 calls being made to the police by members of the general public.

Shortly after Tildesley's disappearance, several witnesses reported seeing a boy who fitted his description being forcefully dragged away from the fairground by a Stooping Man between 7pm and 8pm that evening. Further sightings were at the nearby Cockpit Footpath on the corner of Denmark Street and Langborough Road as well as at Number 9 and Number 51 Langborough Road. One witness reported seeing a boy resembling Tildesley sitting on the wall of the Waitrose car park in Rose Street with a bicycle similar to his at his side at 8:10pm on the evening of his disappearance; however, Tildesley's parents found his bicycle was found chained to railings at the fairground half a mile away at exactly the same time.

Reconstructions
The day after the first Crimewatch UK broadcast, the police shot their first video reconstruction. A seven-year-old local boy dressed in clothes similar to those worn by Tildesley was filmed around Rose Street and at the fairground. Whilst only a partial reconstruction, it did get a positive response.

Two days before the first anniversary of Tildesley's disappearance, and with the Frank Ayers Fun Fair returning to Wokingham, a second police reconstruction was filmed. These included shots in Rose Court, Rose Street, Broad Street, Denmark Street, the Carnival Field and Langborough Road. Ten-year-old Paul Little played the part of Tildesley, whilst Peter Russell played the part of the Stooping Man. In the case's second appearance on the programme in just over a year, the footage was aired at 9:25pm on 13 June 1985 on Crimewatch UK. A full reconstruction of Tildesley's last known moments was broadcast, in which his mother took part. Over 1,000 people called in with information, one of the highest volumes in the programme's history.

Success of appeals
Overall, police received a massive public response with over 1,200 different individuals phoning in, who gave 2,500 potential leads, but little concrete evidence emerged. Crucially, Thames Valley Police never received any breakthroughs that would lead them to either Tildesley being found alive or, in the worst-case scenario, to the identity of the perpetrator(s) and/or the recovery of his body.

Investigations

Initial investigation

The initial investigation was led by Detective Constable Geoff Gilbert. Coincidentally, Gilbert knew Tildesley personally through his mother's job at Wokingham police station.

From the start, Wokingham police were unprepared for such a major task. Only four officers were assigned to the case because Thames Valley Police were short-staffed, as many officers were elsewhere confronting the 1984–1985 miners' strike. As Wokingham police station was too small, the attic storeroom was used as the incident office; the police also promptly set up a mobile office at the fairground. Two days after the disappearance, police had to use the Wokingham Baptist Church on Milton Road in Wokingham (immediately behind the police station) as a meeting room. After six weeks, the case became so big that Thames Valley Police had to move the incident office to Sulhamstead near Newbury.

The police had to check, given the age difference between Tildesley and his siblings, that he was in fact Lavinia Tildesley's son and not Christina's. DC Gilbert was summoned to do this task, which Tildesley's mother described as "ridiculous". Tildesley's brother, Christopher, who had had an argument with him earlier on the day of his disappearance, was initially the prime suspect, but was soon ruled out.

On 7 June 1984, the day of the first Crimewatch UK appeal, two anonymous calls came in to say that they suspected a fairground worker named Martin Earley was responsible for Tildesley's disappearance. He had worked for the funfair for eleven years and was present at the fairground on the night Tildesley went missing. Earley was arrested and confessed to Tildesley's abduction, saying that he had raped and murdered him at his caravan nearby, which fitted in with what a hypnotist had said was likely to have happened to Tildesley. However, he changed his story so many times that it became unreliable, and detectives worked out that he was the wrong man.

On 16 August 1984, the Metropolitan Police interviewed another fairground worker, Sidney Cooke, at his home in London. One of Cooke's colleagues had alerted detectives at the Tildesley incident office about his suspicious behaviour towards young boys in the past. The police asked Cooke whether he was in Wokingham on the night of the disappearance. He claimed that he was working at a fair opposite West Hendon police station in London that night, and the fair owner, Rosie Gray, confirmed that Cooke was her employee. Cooke therefore remained on file but was eliminated as a suspect.

By October 1984, with little new leads to go on, Thames Valley Police started to wind down their investigation into Tildesley's disappearance.

In April 1987, the press released a story about a possible link regarding attempted abductions of young children over the past six months in the Wokingham area. The police investigated whether these abductions could be linked to Tildesley's disappearance, but this was eventually dismissed.

Operation Orchid
In 1989, the Metropolitan Police established Operation Orchid, an enquiry into the disappearance of missing children led by Detective Chief Superintendent Roger Stoodley. As part of this operation, in December 1990, they interviewed convicted paedophile Leslie Bailey, who had already been charged with two other murders, that of 14-year-old Jason Swift and six-year-old Barry Lewis, both of which occurred after Tildesley's disappearance. Investigators had obtained a letter and a hand-drawn map which had been given by Bailey to a fellow inmate at HM Prison Wandsworth. The map showed where Tildesley had been killed; the letter, which had been written by a cellmate, was addressed to Cooke, who belonged to the same paedophile gang as Bailey and who also knew about Tildesley's murder.

At this point Bailey, who suffered from a mild learning disability, confessed that Cooke's paedophile gang, whom the police had nicknamed the "Dirty Dozen", had abducted, drugged, tortured, raped and murdered Tildesley on the night he disappeared. It was at this point that the police realised that the Stooping Man was in fact Cooke.

"Mark's party"
On the night of Tildesley's disappearance, Bailey had been asked by another member of the gang, his lover Lennie Smith, to drive him from Hackney to Wokingham, as there would be a 'party' in a caravan owned by Cooke located near the fairground.

Upon arrival, Bailey parked in Langborough Road and Smith went into the funfair to find Cooke. They returned to Bailey's car with a young boy who was 'dragging back', despite being enticed away from the fairground on the promise of a 50p bag of sweets. The young boy, Tildesley, had to be physically picked up and forced into the back of the car. With Bailey driving, Smith was in the front passenger seat, whilst Cooke was holding Tildesley back in the rear of the car. They then met a fourth man, a relative of Bailey's known as "Odd Bod" at Cooke's caravan, located on a field called The Moors on Evendons Lane, between Finchampstead and Barkham.

Cooke gave Tildesley a glass of milk laced with muscle relaxant, of which he only drank half; as he said it 'tastes funny', the four men raped Tildesley, starting with Cooke and ending with Smith. After more muscle relaxant was applied directly down the boy's throat, the gang rape started again. Smith then forced a tablet into Tildesley's mouth before grabbing him by the throat. The abuse had already lasted for half an hour before Bailey realised Tildesley was dead, but Cooke had told him that the child was fine and that he (Cooke) would take him home. This meant that it was likely that Tildesley was already dead before his parents even knew that he was missing.

After the murder, Bailey drove Smith back to Hackney, arriving there after midnight. Before Bailey dropped Smith off at the marshes, Smith said that he would leave the disposal of the body to Cooke.

Unfinished investigation
The police received a Judge's Commendation for pursuing an honourable and sustained investigation which led to the eventual solving of the Tildesley case. However, the police admitted in public that the case had not been finished as Tildesley's body had not been found. In 2007, Thames Valley Police set up the Dedicated Review Team to re-investigate unsolved murders and serious sexual assaults over the previous fifty years, which included Tildesley's murder, but nothing has come of it.

Tildesley is the "Dirty Dozen" ring's first known murder victim. However, in 2015, following media and political pressure, the police re-opened the investigation into the 1981 murder of seven-year-old Vishal Mehrotra near East Putney tube station in London. The gang are being investigated in relation to this killing, which took place more than three years prior to the murder of Tildesley.

In 2015, Stoodley expressed concern about a "cover up" by the Metropolitan Police over the Tildesley case, maintaining that there was sufficient evidence to prosecute Cooke over the killing.

Legal proceedings

Sidney Charles Cooke

Cooke has never admitted playing any role in Tildesley's murder, despite a key ring identical to the one owned by the boy being found in his repossessed Jaguar XJ in 1985, a year after the disappearance. No charges were brought against him as the Crown Prosecution Service (CPS) felt that Bailey's confession was insufficient evidence for Cooke's case to result in a successful conviction, as well as the fact that Cooke was already serving time in prison for the manslaughter of Jason Swift.

Leslie Patrick Bailey
When he was sent to trial for Tildesley's killing, Bailey was already serving a prison sentence in HM Prison Whitemoor for the manslaughter of Jason Swift. On 7 October 1993, Bailey was murdered by two fellow inmates via strangulation with a ligature. His death was welcomed by Tildesley's parents.

Leonard William Gilchrist "Lennie" Smith
Smith has never admitted playing any role in Tildesley's murder. No charges were therefore brought against him as the CPS felt that Bailey's confession was insufficient evidence for Smith's case to result in a successful conviction.

Smith died of AIDS in a secret unit in HM Prison Nottingham in 2006. Once again, Mrs Tildesley responded by celebrating the news.

"Odd Bod"
A fourth man, mentioned by Bailey as part of the Operation Orchid investigation as being partly responsible for Tildesley's murder, was a relative of his. He was referred to as 'Odd Bod' throughout the investigation. However, as "Odd Bod" had the mental age of an eight-year-old, he could not have his name disclosed or be charged, put on trial or sentenced in connection with the killing. No charges were therefore brought against him as the CPS considered him to be too young for his case to result in a successful conviction.

Trial
On 18 October 1991, Bailey, 'with persons unknown', was charged with the murder of Tildesley. The subsequent trial was very unusual in that, despite Cooke and Smith not having been formally charged in the murder, the judge publicly named them as the perpetrators. Equally unusual was Bailey's instructions to his defence barrister to seek the maximum sentence possible, saying that he was 'surprised and disappointed' that Cooke and Smith were not in the dock with him.

On 22 October 1992, Bailey pleaded guilty at Reading Crown Court to the lesser charge of manslaughter and one charge of buggery, and received two life sentences on 9 December. On hearing the verdict, Tildesley's mother responded by calling for the re-introduction of the death penalty, saying, "He should have been hanged."

Body
Bailey claimed he did not know where Cooke had buried the body. Cooke has indicated he knows the location of the body but refuses to tell the police, or the boy's family, where. Following the confession by Bailey to the murder, the police dug up The Moors in March 1991, but they did not find anything.

In May 1998, the police refused to re-question Cooke in relation to Tildesley's murder, and also refused to dig up a nearby golf course to search for his remains. In 2012, a fragment of human skull, discovered near Evendons Lane, was found not to be Tildesley's.

Tildesley's body has never been found and the murder is among Wokingham's most notorious crimes. Thames Valley Police initially thought his body was buried within a mile of the fairground from which he was abducted, but they now believe that his body is buried in a shallow grave on abandoned farmland. In 2019 the victim's family made a last-ditch plea begging Cooke, who is in his nineties, to reveal the whereabouts of Tildesley's body.

Aftermath and memorials

Tildesley's bedroom
Tildesley's parents kept his bedroom exactly how it was the day he went missing until his mother moved to nearby Langley Common Road in Barkham (further away than Evendons Lane), shortly after his father's death in 2005.

Memorial bench
Shortly after Tildesley's disappearance, a public memorial, that of a jade-coloured bench, was erected exactly at the very spot where he was seen leaving the fairground by the general public. This can be seen directly to the right of the entrance to the Carnival Leisure Park on Wellington Road in Wokingham. A name plate on a plank of wood at the top of the bench reads "In Memory of MARK TILDESLEY". When Tildesley's mother died in 2011, a second name plate bearing her name was put on the bench, directly beneath the original plate, in remembrance of her.

Memorial service
A memorial service was held on 30 January 1993 at the Rose Street Methodist Church (now the Wokingham Methodist Church) in Rose Street in Wokingham, located opposite to the Tildesley residence.

Headstone

A headstone to Tildesley was erected, on 30 January 1993, at the Free Church Burial Ground on Reading Road in Wokingham. It reads "IN LOVING MEMORY OF MARK ANTHONY TILDESLEY BORN 31 AUGUST 1976".

Television

Tildesley's murder appeared in the BBC Crimewatch episodes on both 7 June 1984 and 13 June 1985.
Tildesley's murder was documented in the BBC Crimewatch File "The Lost Boys" episode in 1994.
Tildesley's murder was featured in an episode of the Channel 4 programme Dispatches in the late 1990s.
Tildesley's murder was featured in the episode of BBC Panorama on 11 May 1998.

Books
Tildesley's murder was featured in the 1993 book "Lambs to the Slaughter" by Ted Oliver and Ramsay Smith. Oliver and Smith were editors of the Daily Mirror at the time of Tildesley's disappearance.

See also
List of major crimes in the United Kingdom
List of solved missing persons cases
List of unsolved murders in the United Kingdom

References

External links
 Spotlight on abuse: The past on trial: Operation Orchid

1984 in England
1984 murders in the United Kingdom
1980s in Berkshire
1980s missing person cases
Deaths by person in England
Gang rape in Europe
Incidents of violence against boys
June 1984 crimes
June 1984 events in the United Kingdom
Male murder victims
Murder convictions without a body
Murder in Berkshire
Pedophilia
Rape in England
Rape in the 1980s
Rape of males
Torture in England
Victims of serial killers
Violence against men in the United Kingdom
Wokingham